Andrea Boquete (born 24 September 1990) is an Argentine basketball player for Obras Basket and the Argentina women's national basketball team. She is playing (season 22-23) for Universitario Baxi Ferrol in the Spanish Challenge League.

She defended Argentina at the 2018 FIBA Women's Basketball World Cup.

References

External links
 
 
 

1990 births
Living people
Argentine expatriate basketball people in Spain
Argentine expatriate sportspeople in Brazil
Argentine women's basketball players
Basketball players at the 2019 Pan American Games
Pan American Games 3x3 basketball players
Small forwards
Sportspeople from Mendoza, Argentina
Pan American Games medalists in basketball
Pan American Games silver medalists for Argentina
Medalists at the 2019 Pan American Games